The dry ice color show is a demonstration of the chemical formation of carbonic acid by the dissolution of dry ice (the solid or frozen form of carbon dioxide – ) in water. The dry ice color show is usually performed in classrooms to demonstrate the properties of acids and bases, their effect on pH indicators, and the sublimation of dry ice. Set-up is simple and generally involves only minor hazards, principal among which is the low temperature of dry ice, which can cause frostbite upon skin contact. The carbonic acid formed in the demonstration is a weak acid and is not hazardous, being present in numerous consumer products including tonic water, soda, and beer.

Description  

This experiment illustrates the properties of acids, bases, pH indicators, and the properties of carbon dioxide. A large amount of universal indicator is first added to water for the visual detection of changes in the solution's pH. Then, a few drops of ammonia or sodium hydroxide is mixed into the solution, which changes the color of the solution to a deep green color. Dry ice is subsequently added to form carbonic acid, changing the pH of the solution from basic to acidic. This is identified by the color change from green to yellow. Simultaneously, a cloud of carbon dioxide is generated from the sublimation of dry ice due to the condensation of water vapor in the air.

Chemical explanation  

Ammonia is a weak alkali that reacts reversibly with water and alters the pH of the solution into base condition.

NH3(g) + H2O(l)  NH4+(aq) + OH−(aq)

On the other hand, if sodium hydroxide is added to adjust the pH of the solution to alkali, the color change develops faster than the ammonia as it is a highly reactive compound.

2 NaOH(aq) + CO2(g)  Na2CO3(aq) + H2O(l)

When dry ice is added to water, it sublimes to carbon dioxide gas rapidly because the solution's temperature is warmer than the dry ice (-78.5 C° or -109.3 F°). This gas can be observed as bubbles or clouds above the solution. Since the temperature of the gas is so cold, the water vapor containing in the air above the water condenses into small water droplets or clouds suspending in the carbon dioxide gas.

CO2(s)  CO2(g)

However, some of them react reversibly with water molecules to form acidic solution symbolized by the production of hydrogen ion.

CO2(aq) + H2O(l)  HCO3−(aq) + H+(aq)

When the acidic solution is mixed together with the alkali present in the solution, the solution, overall, becomes neutral.

HCO3−(aq) + H+(aq) + NH4+(aq) + OH−(aq)    NH4+(aq) + HCO3−(aq) + H2O(l)       (addition of ammonia)

HCO3−(aq) + H+(aq) + Na+(aq) + OH−(aq)    Na+(aq) + HCO3−(aq) + H2O(l)          (addition of sodium hydroxide)

The color of the solution changes due to the universal indicator, a pH detector. Once the alkali-to-acid universal indicator is incorporated into the solution, the color of the solution changes corresponding to the acidic color of the universal indicator. The color of ammonia and water only is green. However, once the dry ice is added, the solution slowly turns orange as more hydrogen ions are continuously produced.

Precautions 

Dry ice sublimates at –78.5 °C (109.3°F) and is a cryogenic hazard. Proper PPE including appropriate gloves are required when handling, and bare skin contact should be avoided. Dry ice will naturally sublimate away in ambient air, but should always be kept in a well-ventilated area to prevent hazardous buildup of carbon dioxide gas or displace oxygen. Carbon dioxide over-exposure can result in shortness of breath, headache, hyperventilation, anxiety and can trigger panic attacks in vulnerable individuals.

References 

Chemistry classroom experiments
Articles containing video clips